The Mixed 25m Sport Pistol SH1 shooting event at the 2004 Summer Paralympics was competed  on 21 September. It was won by Muharrem Korhan Yamac, representing Turkey.

Preliminary

21 Sept. 2004, 09:00

Final round

21 Sept. 2004, 13:00

References

X